Sabda Alam (Nature's Order) is a  1978 Indonesian album released by  Musica Studios. It is Chrisye's second studio album and his first after signing with Musica. The album was written in collaboration with Guruh Sukarnoputra. It was well received and, in 2007, was listed by Rolling Stone Indonesia as one of the 150 best Indonesian albums of all time. Actually, this album was scheduled to be released in August 1977, but it was officially released in early 1978.

Production
After the success of Badai Pasti Berlalu, Chrisye was approached by Amin Wijaya of Musica Studios and offered a chance to record an album. Chrisye agreed upon the condition that he would be given creative freedom. Musica agreed to those conditions. Chrisye later recalled receiving much support from Amin during the recording of Sabda Alam.

Sabda Alam was recorded in Musica's studios in Jakarta, Indonesia using double tracking. It featured Chrisye on vocals, guitar, and bass, Jockie Soerjoprajogo on acoustic piano and keyboard, and Keenan Nasution on drums and percussion, with arrangement by Chrisye and Yockie. Guruh Sukarnoputra, who previously collaborated with Chrisye on Guruh Gipsy, contributed three songs.

The songs were written and produced in a similar style as Badai Pasti Berlalu, with romantic and melancholic songs. Recording took place from morning until night; Chrisye eventually fell ill from the effort. During the recording, executives from Musica were not allowed to enter, even though they requested it often.

Track listing

Reception
Sabda Alam was well-received upon release and sold well. In 2007, Rolling Stone Indonesia listed Sabda Alam as the 51st best Indonesian album of all time, and in 2009 they selected "Anak Jalanan" as the 72nd best Indonesian song of all time.

Reissues
Sabda Alam has been reissued twice, once as a CD in 2004 and once as part of the Chrisye Masterpiece Trilogy Limited Edition in 2007.

References

1978 albums
Chrisye albums
Indonesian-language albums